Bogdan Korak (born 2 November 1959) is a Serbian football manager and former player.

Playing career
During the 1980s, Korak played seven seasons for Rad, helping them win promotion to the Yugoslav First League in 1987. He subsequently spent some time abroad in Spain (Real Murcia) and Austria (Vorwärts Steyr). Later on, Korak returned to his homeland and played for Mogren in the 1990–91 Yugoslav Second League.

Managerial career
After hanging up his boots, Korak was manager of numerous clubs in his country and abroad, including Rad and Hajduk Kula.

Between November 2010 and August 2011, Korak served as manager of Ghana Premier League club Asante Kotoko.

References

External links
 
 
 

1959 births
Living people
Footballers from Belgrade
Yugoslav footballers
Serbia and Montenegro footballers
Serbian footballers
Association football forwards
FK Rad players
Real Murcia players
SK Vorwärts Steyr players
FK Mogren players
FK Hajduk Beograd players
Yugoslav Second League players
Yugoslav First League players
Segunda División players
Austrian Football Bundesliga players
Yugoslav expatriate footballers
Expatriate footballers in Spain
Expatriate footballers in Austria
Yugoslav expatriate sportspeople in Spain
Yugoslav expatriate sportspeople in Austria
Serbia and Montenegro football managers
Serbian football managers
FK BSK Borča managers
FK Radnički 1923 managers
FK Rad managers
FK Hajduk Kula managers
Asante Kotoko S.C. managers
FK Leotar managers
RFK Novi Sad 1921 managers
OFK Grbalj managers
FK Kolubara managers
Serbian SuperLiga managers
Ghana Premier League managers
Serbian expatriate football managers
Expatriate football managers in Ghana
Expatriate football managers in Bosnia and Herzegovina
Expatriate football managers in Montenegro
Serbian expatriate sportspeople in Ghana
Serbian expatriate sportspeople in Bosnia and Herzegovina
Serbian expatriate sportspeople in Montenegro